The Best of Minnie Riperton is a posthumous greatest hits album by American singer Minnie Riperton, released in 1981 and issued by Capitol Records.  The album consists of the hits like "Perfect Angel," "Lovin' You," "Inside My Love" and "Adventures in Paradise".  Also included are her last two released singles "Here We Go" and "You Take My Breath Away," both from the album Love Lives Forever.

The hits album features a new remix of "Memory Lane"; unreleased live versions of "Can You Feel What I'm Saying?", "Lover And Friend", and "Young, Willing, and Able"; two brief dialog tracks called "Moments with Minnie..."; and a cover of Joni Mitchell's "A Woman of Heart And Mind", a holdover from the Minnie sessions, as the "new" track.

Nothing from Riperton's Come to My Garden album appears here, nor does her early Chess Records releases as Andrea Davis or her material as a member of Rotary Connection (That would come later in 2001 on the 2-CD set Petals: The Minnie Riperton Collection).  This album only covers her catolog with both Epic Records and Capitol Records.

Track listing

Credits
Art Direction – Roy Kohara
Mixed By – David Cole (4) (tracks: A3)
Photography By – George Hurrell
Producer – Henry Lewy (tracks: A3, B1, B2), Johnny Pate (tracks: A6, B4), Minnie Riperton (tracks: A2 to A5, A7 to B3, B6)Richard Rudolph (tracks: A2 to B4, B6), Stewart Levine (tracks: A5, A7, B6)

Charts

References

External links
The Best of Minnie Riperton (Vinyl, LP). Discogs

1981 compilation albums
Capitol Records compilation albums
Minnie Riperton compilation albums
Albums produced by Johnny Pate
Albums produced by Stevie Wonder
Albums produced by Stewart Levine
Albums produced by Henry Lewy
Compilation albums published posthumously